Austria competed at the 1968 Winter Olympics in Grenoble, France.

Medalists

Alpine skiing

Men

Men's slalom

Women

Biathlon

Men

 1 One minute added per close miss (a hit in the outer ring), two minutes added per complete miss.

Men's 4 x 7.5 km relay

 2 A penalty loop of 200 metres had to be skied per missed target.

Bobsleigh

Cross-country skiing

Men

Men's 4 × 10 km relay

Figure skating

Men

Women

Ice hockey

Consolation round 
Teams in this group play for 9th-14th places. Austria entered in this round, from the start they did not play for the medals.

 Romania –  Austria 3:2 (2:1, 1:1, 0:0)
Goalscorers: Fagarasi, Calamar, Mois – Schupp, Samonig.

 Yugoslavia –  Austria 6:0 (2:0, 2:0, 2:0)
Goalscorers: Ivo Jan 3, Roman Smolej, Tisler, Klinar.

 France –  Austria 2:5 (0:1, 2:3, 0:1)
Goalscorers: Faucomprez, Caux – Puschnig 2, Kirchbaumer, St. John, Schupp.

  Norway –  Austria 5:4 (3:1, 2:1, 0:2)
Goalscorers: Dalsören 2, Bjölbak, Olsen, Hansen – Schupp 2, Weingärtner, St. John.

 Japan –  Austria  11:1 (1:0, 6:0, 4:1)
Goalscorers: Itoh 2, Okajima 2, Hikigi 2, Araki, Kudo, Takashima, Toriyabe, Iwamoto – Puschnig.

Contestants
13. AUSTRIA
Goaltenders: Franz Schilcher, Karl Pregl
Defence: Gerd Schager, Gerhard Felfernig, Josef Mössmer, Hermann Erhard, Gerhard Hausner 
Forwards: Dieter Kalt, Adelbert St. John, Josef Puschnig, Josef Schwitzer, Heinz Schupp, Walter König, Heinz Knoflach, Klaus Weingartner, Klaus Kirchbaumer, Günter Burkhart, Paul Samonig

Luge

Men

(Men's) Doubles

Women

Nordic combined 

Events:
 normal hill ski jumping 
 15 km cross-country skiing

Ski jumping

Speed skating

Men

References
Official Olympic Reports
International Olympic Committee results database
 Olympic Winter Games 1968, full results by sports-reference.com

Nations at the 1968 Winter Olympics
1968
Winter Olympics